Jendraschek, Gerd is a German linguist specialized in Basque, Turkish, and Iatmul (a language from the East Sepik Province, Papua New Guinea). He was Assistant Professor of General and Comparative Linguistics at the University of Regensburg, Germany, until July 2012, and a Korea Foundation Fellow from September 2012 until August 2013. He is currently Assistant Professor at Sangmyung University in Cheonan, South Korea.

References
 Jendraschek, Gerd. 2001. Semantic and structural properties of Turkish ideophones. Turkic Languages 5: 88-103.
 Jendraschek, Gerd. 2002. The struggle against monolingualism. Journal of Universal Language 3:55-75.
 Jendraschek, Gerd. 2002. Semantische Eigenschaften von Ideophonen im Türkischen. München: LINCOM Europa (Edition Linguistik, 30).
 Jendraschek, Gerd. 2003. La modalité épistémique en basque. München: LINCOM Europa (LINCOM Studies in Basque Linguistics, 05).
 Jendraschek, Gerd. 2007. Basque in contact with Romance languages. In Alexandra Y. Aikhenvald and R.M.W. Dixon (Eds.), Grammars in Contact. A Cross-Linguistic Typology. Oxford: Oxford University Press.
 Jendraschek, Gerd. 2007. La notion modale de possibilité en basque. Morphologie, syntaxe, sémantique, variations diachronique et sociolinguistique. Paris: L’Harmattan.
 Jendraschek, Gerd. 2009. Origin and development of the Iatmul focus construction: Subordination, desubordination, resubordination. Folia Linguistica 43.2: 345-390.
 Jendraschek, Gerd. 2011. A fresh look at the tense-aspect system of Turkish. Language Research 47.2: 245-270.
 Jendraschek, Gerd. 2012. From polyfusional to post-fusional: Obsolescence and innovation in Basque predicate morphosyntax and its typological implications. Rice Working Papers in Linguistics 3: 1-33. 
 Jendraschek, Gerd. 2014. Future tense, prospective aspect, and irrealis mood as part of the situation perspective: Insights from Basque, Turkish, and Papuan. In Philippe De Brabanter, Mikhail Kissine and Saghie Sharifzadeh (Eds.), Future times, future tenses. Oxford: Oxford University Press (Oxford Studies of Time in Language and Thought); 138-164.

External links
 

Linguists from Germany
Living people
Year of birth missing (living people)